Arie Freiberg  (born 22 August 1949) is an Israeli-born Australian legal academic. He was formerly Dean of Monash Law School from 2004 and retired at the end of 2012. His expertise is in criminal law and criminology and he is current Chair of the Victorian Sentencing Advisory Council. His research has focussed on sentencing and the administration of criminal justice, but he has over one hundred publications in many areas of law.

Early life
Freiberg was born in Israel, and settled in Australia in 1955. He spent his undergraduate years at the University of Melbourne, where he studied law and criminology. He graduated in 1972 with an honours degree in Law and a diploma in Criminology. He held a number of professional and academic positions, including editor of the Monash University Law Review, before obtaining a Master of Laws from Monash in 1984.

Professional career
Before being appointed Foundation Chair of Criminology at Melbourne University in 1991, Freiberg held a number of professional and academic positions. He was Reader in Law at Monash University, and worked for the Commonwealth Director of Public Prosecutions, as well as the Australian Institute of Criminology. Within a year of his appointment as Professor at Melbourne University, he was made Head of Criminology, and the Dean of the Arts Faculty. In 2004, Freiberg was appointed Dean of Law at Monash University.

In addition to his involvement in the Sentencing Advisory Council, Freiberg has held positions with the Australian Institute of Criminology and the Commonwealth Director of Public Prosecutions. He has served as President of the Australian and New Zealand Society for Criminology and is currently a member of the Council of the Australian Institute of Judicial Administration.  He is also a fellow of the Academy of the Social Sciences in Australia. He has worked as a consultant to governments in Australia and around the world. In 2009, Freiberg was made a Member of the Order of Australia for his contributions to criminology, sentencing law, legal education and academic leadership.

Sentencing Advisory Council
After leading a major review of sentencing laws during 2001–2002, Pathways to Justice, Freiberg was appointed by the Victorian Government as foundation chair of the newly established the Sentencing Advisory Council in 2004. The council is an independent statutory body which advises the Victorian Government on sentencing laws, and liaises with and educates the broader community on sentencing.

As chairman of the council, Freiberg has made a number of major recommendations on sentencing law reform. The most publicised and controversial of these was the abolition of suspended sentences, which Freiberg labelled "inherently flawed". He has also urged for the removal of provocation as a relevant consideration in sentencing for homicides, increased use of home detention, and has advocated increased use of specialised courts such as drug courts. Freiberg has also recommended that judges be allowed to indicate to defendants what their penalty may be if they plead guilty, as a means of encouraging early guilty pleas, reducing court backlogs and preventing victims from experiencing the trauma of a trial.
More broadly, Freiberg's recent work has focussed on the developing area of non-adversarial justice.

Publications
Freiberg has over 100 publications on a wide range of issues surrounding law and criminology. Some of his most prominent works include:

 Non-Adversarial Justice (Melbourne, The Federation Press)
 Pathways to Justice (Melbourne, Department of Justice)
 Penal Populism, Sentencing Councils and Sentencing Policy (Hawkins Press)
 Sentencing Review: Pathways to Justice (Melbourne, Department of Justice)
 Sentencing: State and Federal Law in Victoria (Melbourne, Oxford University Press)
 Sentencing Reform and Penal Change: The Victorian Experience''' (Sydney, The Federation Press)
 Sentencing Review: Drug Courts and Related Options'' (Melbourne, Department of Justice)

References

1949 births
Living people
Australian legal scholars
Australian criminologists
Australian Jews
Academics from Melbourne
Israeli emigrants to Australia
Academic staff of Monash University
Monash Law School alumni
Melbourne Law School alumni
Members of the Order of Australia